Paigham TV is an Islamic educational media group. It launched its Urdu language TV channel in 2011 and Pashto Channel in 2014. Paigham TV was inaugurated by Imam al-Kabah Abdul Rahman Al-Sudais in Harmain Al Sharifain Auditorium. The production of this channel is based on the teachings of Quran and Sunnah. A team of Islamic scholars monitors the material presented on its programs. Each program of Paigham TV is previewed according to authentic references of Quran and Hadith. The Board of Directors, consisting of 14 members from different countries, is working under the supervision of Imam al-Kabah Al-Sheikh Abdul Rahman Al-Sudais, looking after the matters of Paigham TV. Paigham TV is transmitted through Asia Satellite 3S in more than 70 Asian countries and Australia. It can also be watched through live streaming on its official website. Mobile Phone application is also available to watch live streaming.

Mission 
 To spread the teachings of Quran  and Sunnah.
 To promote peace and unity between Muslims.
 To eliminate the Non-Islamic customs, ill-beliefs and misunderstandings about Islam.
 To defend the ideological attacks on Islam.
 To educate the Urdu-speaking community all over the world about Islam.
 To aware the youth of Muslim Ummah about Islamic history and Personalities of Muslim Heroes.
 To reincarnate the soul of National identity based on Islam and Two Nation Theory within our people.

Objectives 
 To create the spirit of Islamization.
 To educate the people of Pakistan using the tools of electronic and social media.
 To discover our Islamic identity for which we need to create awareness, understanding and conscience in the masses.
 To awaken the nation by bringing home the message of fraternity, social justice and philanthropy to make them the proud bearers of their nationality and Muslim identity.

Management 

 Chairman: Imam al-Kabah Al-Sheikh Abdul Rahman Al-Sudais 
 Pattern-in-Chief: Senator Professor Sajid Mir
 Chief Executive Officer: Dr. Hafiz Abdul Kareem
 Chief Operating Officer: Hafiz Nadeem Ahmed
 Director Programs: Fakhar ul Islam

Board of directors 

 Imam Kabaah Al- sheikh Abdul Rahman Al-Sudais (KSA)
 Senator Professor Sajid Mir (Pakistan)
 Al-sheikh Tariq Bin Samee Al-eesa (Kuwait)
 Al-sheikh Ali Bin Ahmed Al-Olovi (KSA)
 Al-sheikh Adil Bin Abdur Rehman (Bahrin)
 Dr. Hafiz Abdul Kareem (Pakistan)
 Dr. Muhammad Ilyas (Bangladesh)
 Al-sheikh Ali Muhammad Abu Turab (Pakistan)
 Al-sheikh Asghar Ali Imam Mehdi (India)
 Al-sheikh Shoib Ahmed Mirpuri (U.K.)
 Al-sheikh Abdul Malik Mujahid (Pakistan)

Locations and offices 

 Lahore
 Islamabad 
 Quetta

Coverage
Paigham TV is transmitted through Asia Satellite 3S in more than 65 Asian countries and Australia. It can also be watched through live streaming on its official website. Mobile phone application is also available to watch live streaming.

Program categories 

 Telawat-e-Quran
 Hamd-o-Naats
 Khutbat-e-Hurmain
 Talk Shows
 Road Shows
 Scholar's Lectures
 Public Lectures
 Documentary
 Children Programs
 Women Programs
 Youth Talks

YouTube Channel

Name
The word paigham is an Urdu word meaning "message".

References

Television networks in Pakistan
Television stations in Lahore
Islamic television networks
Television channels and stations established in 2011
Salafism in Pakistan
Religious television stations in Pakistan